Munting Anghel (International title: Little Angel) is a 2000 Philippine television drama series broadcast by GMA Network. The series is the fourth installment of GMA Mini-Series. Directed by Louie Ignacio, it stars Isabella de Leon in the title role. It premiered on September 4, 2000 replacing Umulan Man o Umaraw. The series concluded on November 27, 2000 with a total of 13 episodes. It was replaced by Tuwing Kapiling Ka in its timeslot.

Cast and characters

Lead cast
 Isabella de Leon as Angelina

Supporting cast
 Antoinette Taus as Florence
 Wendell Ramos as Enrico
 Glydel Mercado as Monica
 Matthew Mendoza as Edward
 Daisy Reyes as Trinidad
 Gary Estrada as Jose
 Bing Loyzaga as Ms. Elvira
 Cheska Garcia as Abby
 Alicia Alonzo as Lily
 Eva Darren as Intiang
 Raymond Bagatsing as Rigor
 Ana Capri as Agnes
 Jackie Forster as Sylvia
 John Apacible as Arturo
 Kristal Moreno as Stefany
 Empress Schuck as Bubbles

References

2000 Philippine television series debuts
2000 Philippine television series endings
Filipino-language television shows
GMA Network drama series
Television shows set in the Philippines